Temperature of Love is a 2017 South Korean television series written by Ha Myung-hee and starring Seo Hyun-jin, Yang Se-jong, Kim Jae-wook and Jo Bo-ah. It is based on the screenwriter's own novel titled Good Soup Never Picks up the Phone, released in 2014. It aired from September 18 to November 21, 2017, on SBS TV's Mondays and Tuesdays at 22:00 (KST) time slot for 40 episodes.

Synopsis
The story of two people who first meet online and soon develop a relationship when they meet in person, but then get separated after choosing different paths for their careers.

Cast

Main
 Seo Hyun-jin as Lee Hyun-soo / Jane (username), an aspiring screenwriter who spent ten years as an assistant writer.
 Yang Se-jong as On Jung-seon / Good Soup (username), a chef-owner of a Michelin-star restaurant called Good Soup.
 Kim Jae-wook as Park Jung-woo, an entertainment agency CEO and business partner of Jung-seon.
 Jo Bo-ah as Ji Hong-ah, Hyun-soo's friend who was born with a silver spoon in her mouth but aims to be a screenwriter. She has a crush on On Jung-seon.

Supporting

Good Soup staff
  as Choi Won-joon, a sous chef.
 Cha In-ha as Kim Ha-sung, a chef.
 Pyo Ji-hoon as Kang Min-ho, a chef.
 Lee Kang-min as Oh Kyung-soo, a chef.
 Chae So-young as Im Soo-jung, a sommelier.

People around Lee Hyun-soo
 Jung Ae-ri as Park Mi-na, Hyun-soo's mother.
 Sunwoo Jae-duk as Lee Min-jae, Hyun-soo's father.
 Gil Eun-hye as Lee Hyun-yi, Hyun-soo's sister.

People around On Jung-seon
 Lee Mi-sook as Yoo Yeong-mi, Jung-seon's mother.
 Ahn Nae-sang as On Hae-kyung, Jung-seon's father.

Broadcaster's people
 Ji Il-joo as Kim Joon-ha
 Song Young-gyu as Min Yi-bok
 Hwang Seok-jeong as Park Eun-sung

Extended
 Choi Sung-jae as Lee Sung-jae
 Lee Seung-hyung
 Kim Min-young as Kim Ki-da	
 Lee Cho-hee as Hwangbo Kyung
 Shim Hee-sub as Choi Won-joon
 Gong Min-jeung as Soo-yeong

Special appearance
 Ryu Jin as Yoo Hong-jin, Chief Producer.
 Ryu Seung-soo as Shin Ha-rim
 Jang Hyun-sung
 Kim Hwan
 Choi Hwa-jung
 Park Shin-hye as Yoo Hye-jung

Production
 Park Bo-gum and Song Hye-kyo were offered the leading roles of the series in March 2017, both declined.
 Seo Hyun-jin and Yang Se-jong previously worked together on SBS TV series Dr. Romantic (2016).
 The first script reading of the cast was scheduled for July 30, 2017 at the SBS building in Ilsan. Filming started on August 9 in Gangnam, Seoul.

Original soundtrack

Part 1

Part 2

Part 3

Part 4

Part 5

Part 6

Part 7

Part 8

Part 9

Part 10

Ratings

Awards and nominations

Notes

References

External links
  
 
 

Seoul Broadcasting System television dramas
Korean-language television shows
2017 South Korean television series debuts
2017 South Korean television series endings
South Korean romance television series
Television series by Pan Entertainment
Television shows based on South Korean novels